Katharine Kimball A.B.E. (17 April 1866 – 19 March 1949) was an American artist, illustrator, and etcher, who spent most of her later life in England. She is best known for her drawings and etchings of urban and rural landscapes in England and Europe. Many of her images were used to illustrate history and travel publications, such as Paris and Its Story, by T. Okey, and The Story of Canterbury, by G.R. Stirling Taylor.

Biography
Katharine Lyman Kimball was born in Fitzwilliam, New Hampshire the daughter of John Richardson Kimball and Catharine Otis Fulham.   As a child Kimball's portrait was painted by George Fuller.  Kimball spent some time in Cook County, Illinois and Boston, Massachusetts before studying at the National Academy of Design in New York under her cousin William J. Whittemore and then under Frank Short at the Royal College of Art in London. Her first solo exhibition was "A Catalogue of original pen and ink drawings of known and unknown places of interest by Katharine Kimball" in London at the Clifford Gallery in 1902. In 1909 she was elected an associate member of the Royal Society of Painter-Etchers and Engravers. She lived in Bath from 1915 until her death.  Near the end of her life made substantial gifts to the Victoria Art Gallery of works on paper from her own collection. She died at St. James's Square Nursing Home in Bath in 1949 after a short illness.

Kimball donated works to the collections of a number of public art institutions, including:  in 1909 and 1911 the Victoria and Albert Museum in London, the Smithsonian American Art Museum, the Portland Art Museum, the Santa Barbara Museum of Art, the Museum of Fine Arts Boston, the Whitney Museum of American Art, in 1923 to the British Museum and in 1937 9 etchings to The Philadelphia Museum of Art. She was a member of the Daughters of the American Revolution and she and her sister donated a number of objects to their museum.

Career

Bibliography
Kimball was the author or illustrator of several books:

 Henry B. Wheatley, The Story of London, (London, 1904)
 T. Okey, Paris and its Story, (London, J.M. Dent, 1904)
 Ernest Gilliat-Smith, The Story of Bruxelles, (London, J.M. Dent, 1906).
 H. MacNaughton-Jones, The Thames, (London, Kegan Paul, 1908)
 Katharine Kimball, Rochester. A Sketchbook, (London, A. & C. Black, 1912)
 G. R. Stirling Taylor, The Story of Canterbury, (London, J.M. Dent, 1912)

References

1866 births
1949 deaths
20th-century American women artists
Alumni of the Royal College of Art
Artists from New Hampshire
American illustrators
National Academy of Design alumni